Bill Cashmore (17 April 1961, Nottingham – 9 November 2017) was an English actor and playwright, as well as director and co-founder of the organisation Actors in Industry.

Acting
Cashmore attended Denstone College, Uttoxeter, and Downing College, Cambridge, where he read English. He started his acting career in the Cambridge Footlights and went on to have roles in The Bill, Casualty, All Creatures Great and Small, Fist of Fun, and other programmes.

Writer and playwright
Cashmore was a writer and performer for Gimme 5, the live ITV children's programme. He has written several plays with Andy Powrie, including Trip of A Lifetime, published by Samuel French, which has been performed around the world.

Cashmore wrote the following full-length plays and pantomimes: What's in a name?, Amber, Trip of a Lifetime, Time Please, A Breed Apart, Amy is Four, Unaccommodated, Bride or Groom?, Seating Plan, New Year's Resolution.

Cashmore wrote three one-act plays: Past Lives, Daughter, and Him, Her and Them. He also performed in two one-man shows, An Everyday Actor and Bill's Clothes.

Politics
In 2017, he was selected as the Green Party candidate for Chelsea and Fulham, where he stood for the parliament in the 2017 general election, finishing fourth with 1.9% of the vote.

Death
Cashmore died on 9 November 2017, aged 56.

References

External links

http://www.billcashmore.co.uk/

1961 births
2017 deaths
British male television actors
British dramatists and playwrights
British directors
British male dramatists and playwrights
Green Party of England and Wales parliamentary candidates
Actors from Nottingham
Place of death missing